Douglas Horne is a Canadian former politician, who was elected as a BC Liberal Member of the Legislative Assembly of British Columbia in the 2009 provincial election, representing the riding of Coquitlam-Burke Mountain.
He was the Deputy Speaker of the Legislative Assembly of British Columbia. He previously served as the Premier's Parliamentary Secretary, as well as Deputy Chair of the Committee of the Whole (Chair of the Committee of Supply). In addition, he has served as the Chair of the Select Standing Committee on Finance and Government Services (2012–13), Deputy Chair of the Select Standing Committee for Public Accounts (2009–13) and a Member of the Select Standing Committee for Children and Youth (2009–13) for the Legislative Assembly of British Columbia. He also served on the Provincial Treasury Board, the Legislative Review Committee, and the Local Government Elections Task Force during his first term of office.

Prior to being elected he was a corporate executive specializing in corporate finance and business development.

Horne resigned from the legislature on August 14, 2015 to run as the Conservative Party of Canada candidate for Coquitlam—Port Coquitlam in the 2015 election. Horne lost to Ron McKinnon of the Liberal Party.

Following his time in elected office, Horne returned to the private sector and founded Golden Leaf Capital Group, a boutique investment and project management firm based in Vancouver, BC, Canada. Projects under development include Evanesce Packaging Solutions Inc., a company bringing to market a proprietary compostable packaging material.

Electoral record

Federal

Provincial

|}

References

External links
 Douglas Horne

Living people
1966 births
British Columbia candidates for Member of Parliament
British Columbia Liberal Party MLAs
Conservative Party of Canada candidates for the Canadian House of Commons